Minions of Mirth is a role-playing game for Mac OS X and Microsoft Windows by American studio Prairie Games, Inc. The game includes both a single-player and a massively multi-player mode. There were two editions of the game: a free version and a paid version which opened additional character abilities.

It was written and produced by Josh Ritter and Lara Engebretson from 2003, with a launch in December 2005. Online servers from Prairies Games ceased in September 2017, due to a hard drive failure; the official servers closed on 22 September 2017, but single-player and at least one private server still run.

References

External links
 Prairie Games Website
 MoM reborn

2005 video games
Massively multiplayer online role-playing games
MacOS games
Windows games
Torque (game engine) games
Video games developed in the United States